Church of the Theotokos of the Sign is a Russian Orthodox church in Kalininsky City District of Novosibirsk, Russia.

History
Church of the Theotokos of the Sign was built in 1994–1998 by the architect Pyotr Chernobrovtsev.

July 25, 2000, the church was consecrated by Bishop Sergius (Sokolov).

References

Churches in Siberia
Russian Orthodox church buildings in Russia
Churches in Novosibirsk
Kalininsky City District, Novosibirsk
Churches completed in 1998

External links
 Знаменская церковь в Новосибирске: величественная мощь прошлого. Sibka.ru.